The following lists detail the discography of Southern All Stars.

Singles 

Reissues
The first 23 singles were reissued as remastered 8cm CDs on June 25, 1988.
Itoshi no Ellie was reissued with a different sleeve on April 23, 1997.
The first 34 singles were reissued with different sleeves on February 11, 1998.
Katte ni Sinbad is reissued as the Katte ni Sinbad: Munasawagi no Special Box (勝手にシンドバッド 胸さわぎのスペシャルボックス, Willfully, Sinbad: Uneasy Special Box) for the 25th anniversary of the group on June 23, 2003.
The first 44 singles and the Katte ni Sinbad: Munasawagi no Special Box were reissued as remastered 12 cm CDs on June 25, 2005.

Albums

Original albums 

I: Inamura Jane was originally released under the name of "", is not "Southern All Stars". It is a soundtrack album for the same titled movie which was directed by Keisuke Kuwata. Nowadays, it is officially counted as the 10th original album by Southern All Stars.

Compilation albums 
Ballads '77-'82 (バラッド '77～'82) (December 5, 1982) 2 CTs, 2 CDs
Ballads '83-'86 (バラッド2 '83～'86) (June 21, 1987) 2 CTs, 2 CDs1
Suika Southern All Stars 61 Songs (すいか SOUTHERN ALL STARS 61SONGS, Watermelon 61 Southern All Stars Songs) (July 21, 1989) 4 CTs, 4 CDsL
Happy! (HAPPY!) (June 24, 1995) 3 CDs1, L
Umi no Yeah!! (海のYeah!!, Sea's Yeah!!) (June 25, 1998) 2 CDs1, 3M
Ballads 3 ~The Album of Love~ (バラッド3 ～the album of LOVE～) (November 22, 2000) 2 CDs1, 2M
Umi no Oh, Yeah!! (海のOh, Yeah!!, Sea's Oh, Yeah!!) (August 1, 2018) 2 CDs1

Other albums 
 Enoshima ~Southern All Stars Golden Hits Medley (江ノ島, ～Southern All Stars Golden Hits Medley) (September 8, 1993) LP, CDE

E: By —A mega remix of hit singles.

Reissues

Discontinued albums 
All released in Compact Cassette format only.

1: Ranked #1 on Oricon chart.
M: Sold more than million copies.
2M: Sold more than 2 million copies.
3M: Sold more than 3 million copies.
L: Limited release.

Videos

References 

Discographies of Japanese artists
Rock music group discographies